A by-election was held for the New South Wales Legislative Assembly electorate of Northumberland on 23 March 1910. The by-election was triggered by the resignation of Matthew Charlton to successfully contest the 1910 federal election for Hunter.

Dates

Results

Matthew Charlton resigned to successfully contest the 1910 federal election for Hunter.

See also
Electoral results for the district of Northumberland
List of New South Wales state by-elections

References

New South Wales state by-elections
1910 elections in Australia
1910s in New South Wales